A torte  (from German Torte ( (in turn from Latin via Italian torta)) is a rich, usually multilayered, cake that is filled with whipped cream, buttercreams, mousses, jams, or fruit.

Ordinarily, the cooled torte is glazed and garnished.

Tortes are commonly baked in a springform pan. Sponge cake is a common base, but a torte's cake layers may instead be made with little to no flour, using ingredients such as ground nuts or breadcrumbs.

Origin 

The best-known of the typical tortes include the Austrian Sachertorte and Linzertorte, the German Schwarzwälder Kirschtorte, and the many-layered Hungarian Dobos torte. But other well-known European confections are also tortes, such as the French Gâteau St. Honoré.

In Hungary, Czech Republic, Slovakia, Ukraine, and Russia cakes are usually called tortes without differentiating between cake and torte. In Polish, as an example, the word torte is translated into Polish as tort, but tort can be also translated as layer cake or cream cake.

Icing
An element common to some tortes is sweet icing (exceptions are several French tortes, such as Gâteau Mercédès and Gâteau Alcazar). When the cake is layered, a thick covering of icing is placed between the layers, and there is almost always icing on the tops and sides of the torte. An example is the whiskey cake. A number of European tortes do not have layers. Some, for instance German-style "Käsesahnetorte", are unbaked.

Well-known European tortes 

 Dobos torte
 Sacher torte
 Esterházy torte
 Kyiv torte
 Linzer torte
 Swiss roll
 Napoleon torte
 Gâteau Pithiviers
 Princess cake
 Prinzregententorte
 Runebergstårta
 Tarta de Santiago
 Schwarzwälder Kirschtorte (Black Forest cake)
 Smörgåstårta
 St. Honoré cake

See also 
 Torta

References

External links 
- Torte.net Official Website

Cakes